Fernando Jorge may refer to:
 Fernando Jorge (designer) (born 1979), Brazilian jewellery designer
 Fernando Jorge (canoeist) (born 1998), Cuban sprint canoeist

See also
 Fernando Jorge Castro Trenti, Mexican politician
 Fernando Jorge Ferreira Pires (born 1969), Portuguese football manager of Angolan descent